Sheikh Ubeydullah also known as Sayyid Ubeydullah, was the leader of the first modern Kurdish nationalist struggle. Ubeydullah demanded recognition from Ottoman Empire and Qajar dynasty authorities for an independent Kurdish state, or Kurdistan, which he would govern without interference from Ottoman or Qajar authorities.

Sheikh Ubeydullah was an influential landowner in the 19th century and a member of the powerful Kurdish Şemdinan family from Nehri. He was the son of Sheikh Taha and a nephew to Sheikh Salih, from whom he inherited the leadership of the Naqshbandi order in Şemdinan. After his rebellion was suppressed, he was exiled first to Istanbul, then to Hijaz where he died.

Rise to power
The emergence of Islamic scholars and leaders, or Sheikhs, as national leaders among the Kurds was the result of the elimination of hereditary semi-autonomous Kurdish principalities in the Ottoman Empire, especially following the Ottoman centralization policies of the early 19th century. Sheikh Ubeydullah was one of several religious leaders who were there to fill the void and reestablish a sense of lawfulness in the former principalities that had been since left to feuding chieftains. Despite previous revolts by Kurdish leaders to reassert control over territories, mainly their own former principalities, Sheikh Ubeydullah is regarded as the first Kurdish leader whose cause was nationalist and who wished to establish an ethnic Kurdish state.

Sheikh Ubeydullah was from an already powerful family, the Şemdinan from the region of the same name - Şemdinan - who owned considerable amounts of land in the Kurdish areas of the Ottoman Empire. During the Russo-Turkish War in the late 1870s, Ubeydullah led the Kurdish tribal forces, defending the Ottoman Empire against the Russians. In the aftermath of the war, he filled a political vacuum left by the devastation in the area and assumed the Kurdish leadership in the region.

Personality and Kurdish nationalism

In a clear indication of Kurdish nationalist intentions, Ubeydullah wrote in a letter to a Christian missionary in the region: "The Kurdish nation, consisting of more than 500,000 families is a people apart. Their religion is different, and their laws and customs distinct... We are also a nation apart. We want our affairs to be in our hands, so that in the punishment of our own offenders we may be strong and independent, and have privileges like other nations... This is our objective... Otherwise, the whole of Kurdistan will take matter into their own hands, as they are unable to put up with these continual evil deeds and the oppression, which they suffer at the hands of the Persian and Ottoman governments."

Ubeydullah was able to gain the military support of Kurdish tribesmen as well as Nestorian Christians from the Hakkari region. A letter written by a Christian missionary who was in constant contact with Ubeydullah noted, "The Shaykh wrote in his paper a great deal about the Nestorian Christians there, praising them as the best subjects of the Sultan. The Sultan objected to such language, and three times returned the letter for correction. Finally, the Shaykh said, "I don't know much about politics, but I do know something about truth telling, and this is the truth."

Expeditions and subsequent fall
Sheikh Ubeydullah was able to successfully assert his control over the area by gaining the support of Kurdish tribesmen who were hopeful of his objective to restore order in the war-ravaged region. British correspondence during the height of Ubeydullah's power indicates that he was able to successful assert control over a vast region that stretched the former Bohtan, Badinan, Hakkari, and Ardalan confederacies. A late nineteenth century writer, Lord George Curzon, wrote, "A chieftain named Shaykh Obeidallah acquired a great reputation for personal sanctity...and gradually came to be looked upon as the head of Kurdish nationality." Also the British envoy to Iran Abbott reported in July 1880, that Ubeydullah has purchased a considerable amount of villages and territories in both sides of the border between Iran and the Ottoman Empire which might cause a challenge to British influence in the region.  

In 1880, Ubeydullah's militia with the support of mercenaries from the assyrian tiyari tribe invaded the northwestern Kurdish territories of Qajar dynasty in attempt to expand his control. Ubeydullah demanded recognition of a Kurdish state and his rule over the region. His militia was defeated by the Qajar army and he withdrew his forces to Ottoman territories. Facing attacks from both sides of his territory, Ubeydullah eventually surrendered to Ottoman authorities in 1881 and brought to Istanbul. There he was interviewed by the American missionary Henry Otis Dwight to whom he explained that what he wanted for Kurdistan, was inspired by the Masnavi of the Sufi Celaleddin Rumi. From Istanbul he escaped and returned to Nehri for some time. In 1882, he attempted to launch another rebellion, but he was soon re-arrested by the Ottoman Empire and sent into exile to Hijaz, (present-day Saudi Arabia). He died in Mecca in 1883.

References

People from Hakkari
1883 deaths
Political people from the Ottoman Empire
Ottoman Kurdish politicians
Kurdish people from the Ottoman Empire
Naqshbandi order
Year of birth unknown
Kurdish nationalists